The Blossoming of Maximo Oliveros is a 2005 Filipino coming-of-age comedy-drama film directed by Aureaus Solito in his directorial debut, based on a screenplay by Michiko Yamamoto. Set in the slums of Manila, the film is about a gay teen who is torn between his love for a young cop and his loyalty to his family. The film stars Nathan Lopez in the title role, with JR Valentin, Soliman Cruz, Neil Ryan Sese, and Ping Medina in supporting roles.

The film premiered at the 1st Cinemalaya Film Festival in 2005 and was the official entry of the Philippines to the 79th Academy Awards. It has been included in various lists of best LGBTQ films.

Plot
Maxi (Nathan Lopez) is a 12-year-old effeminate gay boy who lives in the slums with his father and brothers who are petty thieves. The story primarily revolves around the conflict between his love for handsome young police officer Victor (JR Valentin), and his family's illegal livelihood. Neo-realist in orientation, the film is a tale of lost innocence and redemption amidst the poverty of Manila's slums.

Maxi behaves like a girl, wearing clips or hairband in his hair and bangles on his wrists and even wearing lipstick.  He is teased by neighbors and former school friends. His sexuality is, however, fully accepted by his two brothers and by his father. One night, he is accosted by two men who attempt to molest him, but is saved by the appearance of Victor.  Victor does not have a girlfriend and his sexuality is kept ambiguous. However, he does rebuff Maxi's advances. In a key event, Maxi's father, his brother Bogs, and Bogs' friends hatch a plan to teach Victor a lesson for snooping into their business. They leave him bloodied and beat up. Just as Victor saved him, it was Maxi who arrived to clean Victor's wounds and cook breakfast for him. Maxi felt sorry and felt somehow responsible for his injuries. Victor then affectionately stroked Maxi's hair and Maxi gives him a kiss on the cheek.

After Maxi's father is killed by Victor's boss which Maxi witnesses, Maxi resists Victor's attempts to renew their friendship. The closing scene shows Maxi walking past Victor who has parked by the roadside on Maxi's way to school.  He ignores Victor as he passes him, hesitates momentarily as he crosses the road, then goes on his way. This last scene is a homage to the final scene of "The Third Man".

Cast 

 Nathan Lopez as Maximo Oliveros
 Soliman Cruz as Paco Oliveros
 JR Valentin as Victor Perez
 Neil Ryan Sese as Boy Oliveros	
 Ping Medina as Bogs Oliveros
 Bodjie Pascua as New Sergeant
 Elmo Redrico as Sarge
 Ivan Camacho as Art
 Lucito Lopez as Police
 Jett Desalesa as Leslie
 Anastacio Cruz as Nar
 Roychell Torre as Monique
 Peter Antony Tumbaga as Peter
 Edwin Pamanian as Isko 
 Rodney Luengu as Mang Axel 
 Claudine Najera as Janet
 Rebecca Padilla as Lolet
 Arnold Cruz as Onnie

Release 
The Blossoming of Maximo Oliveros premiered at the 1st Cinemalaya Independent Film Festival on July 13, 2005, and was released theatrically in the Philippines on November 30, 2005. The film was screened at the 56th Berlin International Film Festival in Germany on February 11, 2006, and the 2006 Las Palmas de Gran Canaria International Film Festival in Spain on March 28, 2006. It was also screened in film festivals in Canada, Singapore, United States, Spain, Hong Kong, Italy, Greece, India, France, United Kingdom, Japan, Estonia, Thailand, Hungary, Switzerland, and South Korea.

Box office
The Blossoming of Maximo Oliveros grossed $28,041 in United States and Canada, and $10,650 in other territories, for a worldwide total of $38,691.

Critical reception

The Blossoming of Maximo Oliveros received mostly positive reviews. V.A. Musetto of New York Post praised Solito's direction, noting that, "Preteen sexuality is a sensitive subject, but director Auraeus Solito handles it with dignity, never becoming exploitative." Critics also praised Lopez' performance. Nathan Lee of The New York Times wrote, "The newcomer Nathan Lopez delights as the flamboyantly gay Maxi." Tom Dawson of BBC wrote, "Newcomer Lopez is wholly convincing in the lead role."

On review aggregator website Rotten Tomatoes, the film has an approval rating of 89% based on 19 reviews. On Metacritic the film has a score of 70% based on reviews from 7 critics. 
Kevin Thomas of Los Angeles Times described the film as "one of the finest Filipino film, shimmering with folkloric charm without softening its view of the harshness and injustice of a life of poverty." Ernest Hardy of LA Weekly wrote "One of those all-too-rare films that handle preadolescent queerness with intelligence and unflinching honesty."

Many critics categorized The Blossoming of Maximo Oliveros as a neo-realist film. Keith Uhlich of Slant Magazine described the film as "a neorealist homo noir." Dennis Harvey of Variety wrote, "an unusually low-key Filipino drama whose neo-realist air generally triumphs over the script's violent, fearful contrivances."

In June 2021, Slant Magazine included the film in its list of 100 Best LGBTQ Films of All Time. It was also included in British Film Institute's 10 Great Gay Films from East and Southeast Asia.

Accolades
The Blossoming of Maximo Oliveros received several awards and nominations. In the Philippines, the film was named Best Picture during the 2006 Gawad Urian Awards and was also named Best Filipino Film of the Decade at the 2010 Gawad Urian Awards. During the 2005 Cinemalaya Independent Film Festival, the film received the Balanghai Trophy for Best Production Design for Clint Catalan. It also received a Special Jury Prize for Solito and Special Citation for Lopez.

The film also made the rounds of international film festivals. It received the Teddy Award (Feature Film) and Glass Bear-Special Mention (Feature Film) at the 56th Berlin International Film Festival. During the 2006 Las Palmas de Gran Canaria International Film Festival, the film received the Golden Lady Harimaguada and Lopez was named as Best Actor. The film was recipient of the Golden Zenith Award for Best Picture at the 2005 Montreal World Film Festival in Canada. The film was also given the NETPAC Award at the 2006 International Film Festival Rotterdam in the Netherlands "for the human portrayal of life  on the margin and the touching performance of Nathan Lopez who plays 'Maxi.'

The film was awarded Best Picture during the 2005 imagineNative Film+Media Arts Festival in Canada and Best Film at 2005 Asian Festival of First Films in Singapore.

Adaptations
In November 2013, eight years after its initial release, The Blossoming of Maximo Oliveros was adapted into a musical entitled Maxie the Musicale: Ang Pagdadalaga ni Maximo Oliveros by Bit by Bit Productions, in association with Philippine Educational Theater Association.

Awards

See also
 List of submissions to the 79th Academy Awards for Best Foreign Language Film
 List of Philippine submissions for the Academy Award for Best Foreign Language Film

References

External links 
  
 The Blossoming of Maximo Oliveros at Box Office Mojo

2005 films
2005 LGBT-related films
2000s coming-of-age drama films
2000s teen drama films
Gay-related films
LGBT-related drama films
LGBT-related coming-of-age films
Philippine coming-of-age drama films
Philippine teen drama films
Philippine teen LGBT-related films
Star Cinema films
2000s Tagalog-language films